Pogăceaua is a commune in Mureș County, Transylvania, Romania composed of ten villages: Bologaia (Balogéja), Ciulea (Csulja), Deleni (Ökröstó), Fântâna Babii, Pârâu Crucii, Pogăceaua, Scurta, Sicele, Valea Sânpetrului, and Văleni.

The commune lies in the Transylvanian Plain, on the banks of the river Șes and its left tributary, Bologa.

As of the 2011 census, Pogăceaua had a population of 2,117: 82.2% Romanians, 15.1% Roma, and 1.3% Hungarians.

See also
List of Hungarian exonyms (Mureș County)

References

Communes in Mureș County
Localities in Transylvania